La Verità was an Italian monthly political magazine which existed between 1936 and 1943. It was based in Rome. The magazine is known for its founder, Nicola Bombacci, a controversial political figure.

History and profile
La Verità was launched by Nicola Bombacci in Rome in 1936. Bombacci also edited the magazine which came out monthly. From 1940 to its closure in 1943 the editors of La Verità were Bombacci and Ezio Riboldi. It supported both fascist and Bolshevik views. It received subsidy from the Italian state.

References

1936 establishments in Italy
1943 disestablishments in Italy
Communist magazines
Defunct political magazines published in Italy
Fascist newspapers and magazines
Italian-language magazines
Magazines established in 1936
Magazines disestablished in 1943
Monthly magazines published in Italy
Magazines published in Rome